Club de Fútbol Femenino Estudiantes de Huelva was a Spanish women's football team from Huelva created in 1998 and disbanded in 2006. A founding member of the new Superliga Femenina in 2001, it was the city's leading women's club until its disappearance. Its major success was reaching the 2003 Copa de la Reina final, which they lost to CE Sabadell.

Estudiantes folded three years later after collapsing financially. Real Sociedad took up their place in Superliga while Sporting Huelva became Huelva's first team.

Season to season

Former internationals
  Brazil: Andréia Suntaque, Kátia Teixeira.
  Portugal: Edite Fernandes.
  Spain: Sonia Bermúdez, Priscila Borja, Vanesa Gimbert, Auxiliadora Jiménez, Keka Vega.

References

Women's football clubs in Spain
Association football clubs disestablished in 2006
2006 disestablishments in Spain
Association football clubs established in 1998
1998 establishments in Spain
Defunct football clubs in Andalusia
Sport in Huelva